George Aylmer was an Irish officer of the Royal Navy during the seventeenth century.

George Aylmer was born in Ireland, the son of Sir Christopher Aylmer, 1st Baronet of County Meath Both his father and mother were part of the Old English community. He was the younger brother of Matthew Aylmer, 1st Baron Aylmer, who went on to become a distinguished Admiral.

During the Nine Years' War, Aylmer was appointed to command the 50-gun ship of the line . He was killed in action against the French during the Battle of Bantry Bay on 11 May 1689.

References

Bibliography
 Harris, Simon. Sir Cloudesley Shovell: Stuart Admiral. The History Press, 2001.

People from County Meath
17th-century Irish people
Irish sailors
1689 deaths
Irish sailors in the Royal Navy
Younger sons of baronets